Trígono (meaning "triangle") is a former municipality in the Evros regional unit, East Macedonia and Thrace, Greece. Since the 2011 local government reform, it is part of the municipality Orestiada, of which it is a municipal unit. The municipal unit has an area of 392.538 km2. Its population is 5,370 (2011 census).  The seat of the municipality was in Dikaia. The municipality was created in 1997 under the Capodistrian Plan. Trigono is the country's northernmost municipal unit, situated in the triangle between the rivers Evros and Ardas. It borders Bulgaria to the north and west, and Turkey to the northeast. The nearest cities are Svilengrad (Bulgaria) to the north, Edirne (Turkey) to the east, and Orestiada to the southeast. The area consists mainly of low hills, with plains in the river valleys, and higher elevations up to 400 m towards the west.

The area of Trigono was under Ottoman Turkish rule until 1912-1913 Balkan Wars. After 7 years of Bulgarian rule, it was ceded to Greece in 1920.

Subdivisions
The municipal unit Trigono is subdivided into the following communities (constituent villages in brackets):
Arzos (Arzos, Kanadas)
Dikaia (Dikaia, Dilofos, Krios, Palli)
Elaia
Therapeio
Komara
Marasia
Milia
Ormenio
Pentalofos
Petrota
Plati
Ptelea
Spilaio

Population

External links
Trigono on GTP Travel Pages

References

 
Populated places in Evros (regional unit)

el:Δήμος Ορεστιάδας#Ενότητα Τριγώνου